Louis L. Merz (July 20, 1908 – September 22, 2002) was a member of the Wisconsin State Assembly.

Biography
Merz was born in Milwaukee, Wisconsin. He was Roman Catholic and was a member of the Society of the Holy Name.

Career
Merz was a member of the Assembly from 1957 to 1962. He was a Democrat.

References

External links
The Political Graveyard

Politicians from Milwaukee
Catholics from Wisconsin
1908 births
2002 deaths
20th-century American politicians
Democratic Party members of the Wisconsin State Assembly